Elotxelerri is a railway station in Loiu, Basque Country, Spain. It is owned by Euskal Trenbide Sarea and operated by Euskotren. It lies on the Txorierri line.

History 
The station was not part of the Txorierri line when it opened in 1894. Due to budget constraints, the original alignment through Mount Artxanda included prolonged steep slopes. This caused a serious accident only two months after the opening, after which the decision was taken to build a tunnel directly under the mountain. The track in which the station is located opened on 31 October 1908, as part of the new alignment between Bilbao and Lezama.

The station was renovated in 2018 after trains on the Txorierri line started running through metro line 3.

Services 

The station is served by Euskotren Trena line E3. It runs every 15 minutes (in each direction) during weekdays, and every 30 minutes during weekends.

References

External links
 

Railway stations in Spain opened in the 1990s
Euskotren Trena stations
Railway stations in Biscay

1990s establishments in the Basque Country (autonomous community)